Bosniaks are an ethnic group in Montenegro, first introduced in the 2003 census. According to the last census from 2011, the total number of Bosniaks in Montenegro was 53,605 or 8.6% of the population. Bosniaks are the third largest ethnic group in the country, after Montenegrins and Serbs.

Demographics

Bosniaks primarily live in the Sandžak area of northern Montenegro, and form the majority of the population in four municipalities: Rožaje (83.91%), Petnjica (83.02%), Plav (56%) and Gusinje (42.64%).

Politics
The main political party of Bosniaks is the Bosniak Party (BS), led by Rafet Husović. The party currently has three seats in Parliament of Montenegro. 
Another one is Justice and Reconciliation Party in Montenegro (SPP u Crnoj Gori), led by Hazbija Kalač.

Majority of Bosniaks of Montenegro were in favor of Montenegrin independence during independence referendum in 2006.

Dialect
The Slavic dialect of Gusinje and Plav shows very high structural influence from Albanian. Its uniqueness in terms of language contact between Albanian and Slavic is explained by the fact that most Slavic-speakers there are of Albanian origin.

Religion 
Today, the majority of Bosniaks are predominantly Sunni Muslim and adhere to the Hanafi school of thought, or law, the largest and oldest school of Islamic law in jurisprudence within Sunni Islam.

Notable people 
Notable Bosniaks from Montenegro, past and present, include:

Film
Izudin Bajrović, actor
Moamer Kasumović, actor and producer

Music
Danijel Alibabić, singer
Senida Hajdarpašić, singer
Dado Polumenta, singer 
Šako Polumenta, singer
Ekrem Jevrić, singer

Literature
Sait Orahovac, writer

Science
Šerbo Rastoder, historian

Politics
Hüseyin Pasha Boljanić, Ottoman statesman and government official
Rifat Rastoder, politician, writer and journalist
Rafet Husović, politician
Selmo Cikotić, Bosnian politician
Ervin Ibrahimović, politician
Mevludin Nuhodžić, politician
Seid Hadžić, politician

Entrepreneurs
Fahrudin Radončić, entrepreneur and politician

Sports
Refik Šabanadžović, former footballer 
Sead Šehović, basketball player 
Suad Šehović, basketball player 
Elsad Zverotić, footballer
Damir Čakar, former footballer
Sead Kolašinac, footballer
Dženan Radončić, former footballer
Ramo Kolenović, former kayaker
Sead Hakšabanović, footballer
Mirsad Huseinovic, former footballer in the U.S. 
Majda Mehmedović, handball player 
Fuad Muzurović, former Bosnian footballer
Ajsel Kujović, former Swedish footballer
Emir Kujović, Swedish footballer
Dino Radončić, basketball player
Elsad Zverotić, former footballer
Derviš Hadžiosmanović, football coach and former player
Refik Šabanadžović, former fotballer
Anel Šabanadžović, footballer
Emir Spahić, fotballer
Izet Hajrović, footballer
Emir Azemović, footballer
Armin Bošnjak, footballer
Tarik Hadžić, alpine skier
Sead Hajrović, footballer
Alma Hasanić Grizović, handball player
Ferid Idrizović, former footballer
Dino Islamović, footballer
Emrah Klimenta, footballer
Edvin Muratović, footballer
Fuad Muzurović, football manager and former player
Adnan Orahovac, footballer
Dženan Radončić, footballer
Ermin Seratlić, footballer
Aldin Skenderovic, footballer
Dževad Turković, footballer
Elsad Zverotić, footballer

Religion
Hafiz Abdurahman Kujević, professor at IU Novi Pazar and W madrasa
Sead Nasufović, Bosniak Islamic cleric and Grand Mufti (Reis ul-Ulema) of Serbia

Other
Sabiha Gökçen, aviator
Sinan Bey Boljanić, sanjak-bey
Hersekzade Ahmed Pasha, Ottoman statesman and navy's grand admiral
Osman Rastoder, commander of the Muslim militia

See also 
Sandžak region
Bosniaks
Bosniaks of Serbia
Islam in Montenegro

References

External links 
Sandžak information
Congress of North American Bosniaks

 
Montenegro
Ethnic groups in Montenegro
Muslim communities in Europe